Rincón, Rincon is a Spanish surname. It may refer to these notable people:
Ann Rincon, American electronic design automation engineer
Antonio del Rincón (1566–1601), novo-Hispanic Nahuatl-language grammarian 
Carolina Rincón, Mexican actress
Daniel Rincón, Colombian road cyclist
Francisco del Rincón, Spanish archbishop
Freddy Rincón, Colombian football midfielder
Hipólito Rincón, retired Spanish footballer and radio commentator
Juan Rincón, Venezuelan baseball player
Oliverio Rincón, Colombian road cyclist
Ricardo Rincón, Mexican baseball player
Tomás Rincón, Venezuelan footballer
Yoreli Rincón, Colombian footballer who has played for the Swedish club LdB Malmö
Brazilian footballers:
Diogo Rincón, Diogo Augusto Pacheco da Fontoura, nicknamed Rincón
Gilvan Santos Souza, nickname Rincón, who plays for Santa Clara
Carlos Eduardo de Castro Lourenço, nickname Rincón, player for Troyes AC

Spanish-language surnames